Daisuke Katayama is a Japanese politician who is a member of the House of Councillors of Japan.

Biography 
He graduated from Keio University in 1992 and from Weaseda University in 2012. .

References 

1966 births
21st-century Japanese politicians
Living people
Members of the House of Councillors (Japan)